John F. Lundgren is the former CEO and Chairman of Stanley Black & Decker (SWK), a position he held from March 1, 2004 through July 31, 2016.

Career
From January 2001 to February 2004 he was the President of European Consumer Products at Georgia-Pacific LLC. From 1997 until January 2001, he was the President of European Consumer Products for Fort James Corporation. From 1995 to 1997, he was the President of European Consumer Products at James River Corporation. From March 1, 2004 until March 12, 2010 he was the Chairman of Stanley Black & Decker, Inc. Since March 2010, he has been the President of Stanley Black & Decker and he has been their Chairman since March 13, 2013. He was rated on CEO Money as one of the top 20 highest paid CEOs in America, coming out at number 5 with $32.6 million.

Board memberships
He is a member of the board of directors of the National Association of Manufacturers (NAM). He is a director at Callaway Golf ELY.

Education
Lundgren is a graduate of Dartmouth College where he was the captain of the golf team. He received his MBA from Stanford University.

Family
Lundgren is married to Tamara Lundgren, CEO of Schnitzer Steel Industries. In August 2005 the two were married at the Berkeley Hotel in London.

References

Living people
Year of birth missing (living people)